Gnathocharax steindachneri is a species of characin fish found in tropical freshwater habitats in the Orinoco and Amazon Basins of South America. It is also found as an aquarium fish. It is the sole member of its genus.

References

Characidae
Monotypic fish genera
Fish of South America
Fish of Brazil
Fish described in 1913